Shaun Huls (born August 17, 1977) is an American football coach and administrator who is currently the Director of Performance/Director of High Performance for the Cleveland Browns. He has also been a coach for the Nebraska Cornhuskers, Nevada Wolf Pack, Hampton University, and the Philadelphia Eagles. From 2002 to 2006, he was the Director of Performance for all 16 Hampton University teams. Huls won his first Super Bowl title as a member of the Eagles' staff when they defeated the New England Patriots in Super Bowl LII.

References

External links
Browns Hire Shaun Huls For New "Director Of High Performance" Role
Huls adds strength to Philadelphia Eagles program
Shaun Huls proves to be more data-driven than mystery man
Sports Science Coordinator? Eagles have one now in Shaun Huls...

1970 births
Living people
People from Le Mars, Iowa
Coaches of American football from Iowa
Nebraska Cornhuskers football coaches
Nebraska Cornhuskers baseball coaches
Nevada Wolf Pack football coaches
Nevada Wolf Pack baseball coaches
Philadelphia Eagles coaches
Cleveland Browns coaches